Tugurgoy is a rural locality (an aul) in Tlyustenkhablskoye Rural Settlement of Teuchezhsky District, the Republic of Adygea, Russia. The population was 382 as of 2018. There are 11 streets.

Geography 
The aul is on the western shore of the Krasnodar Reservoir of the Kuban River, 26 km northwest of Ponezhukay (the district's administrative centre) by road. Tlyustenkhabl is the nearest rural locality.

Ethnicity 
The aul is inhabited by Adyghes, Russians and Azerbaijanis.

References 

Rural localities in Teuchezhsky District